Shelby County is a county located in the northeastern portion of the U.S. state of Missouri. As of the 2020 census, the population was 6,103. Its county seat is Shelbyville. The county was established on January 2, 1835, and named for Governor Isaac Shelby of Kentucky.

Geography

Adjacent counties
Knox County (north)
Lewis County (northeast)
Marion County (east)
Monroe County (south)
Randolph County (southwest)
Macon County (west)

Major highways
 Interstate 72 (Proposed)
 U.S. Route 36
 Route 15
 Route 151
 Route 168

Demographics

As of the census of 2000, there were 6,799 people, 2,745 households, and 1,847 families residing in the county.  The population density was 14 people per square mile (5/km2).  There were 3,245 housing units at an average density of 6 per square mile (2/km2).  The racial makeup of the county was 97.87% White, 0.97% Black or African American, 0.28% Native American, 0.10% Asian, 0.19% from other races, and 0.59% from two or more races. Approximately 0.63% of the population were Hispanic or Latino of any race. 30.4% were of American, 26.9% German, 14.9% English and 8.5% Irish ancestry.

There were 2,745 households, out of which 30.60% had children under the age of 18 living with them, 56.90% were married couples living together, 7.30% had a female householder with no husband present, and 32.70% were non-families. 30.30% of all households were made up of individuals, and 16.60% had someone living alone who was 65 years of age or older.  The average household size was 2.38 and the average family size was 2.98.

In the county, the population was spread out, with 25.40% under the age of 18, 7.20% from 18 to 24, 24.40% from 25 to 44, 23.30% from 45 to 64, and 19.70% who were 65 years of age or older.  The median age was 40 years. For every 100 females there were 91.60 males.  For every 100 females age 18 and over, there were 90.00 males.

The median income for a household in the county was $29,448, and the median income for a family was $35,944. Males had a median income of $25,759 versus $18,996 for females. The per capita income for the county was $15,632.  About 13.00% of families and 16.30% of the population were below the poverty line, including 21.70% of those under age 18 and 14.10% of those age 65 or over.

2020 Census

Education

Public schools
North Shelby School District – Shelbyville
North Shelby Elementary School (K-06)
North Shelby High School (07-12)
Shelby County R-IV School District – Shelbina
South Shelby Elementary School (K-05)
South Shelby Middle School (06-08)
South Shelby High School (09-12)

Private schools
Shiloh Christian School – Shelbina (K-12) – Nondenominational Christian – Alternative School
Heartland Christian Academy (Official Site) – Bethel (PK-12) – Nondenominational Christian

Public libraries
 Clarence Public Library  
 Shelbina Carnegie Public Library

Politics

Local
The Democratic Party predominantly controls politics at the local level in Shelby County. Democrats hold all but one of the elected positions in the county.

State

Shelby County is a part of Missouri's 5th District in the Missouri House of Representatives and is represented by 
Lindell F Shumake (R-Hannibal).

Shelby County is a part of Missouri's 18th District in the Missouri Senate and is currently represented by Brian Munzlinger (R-Williamstown).

Federal

Shelby County is included in Missouri's 6th Congressional District and is currently represented by Sam Graves (R-Tarkio) in the U.S. House of Representatives.

Missouri presidential preference primary (2008)

Former U.S. Senator Hillary Clinton (D-New York) received more votes, a total of 460, than any candidate from either party in Shelby County during the 2008 presidential primary.

Communities

Cities

Clarence
Hunnewell
Shelbina
Shelbyville (county seat)

Villages
Bethel
Leonard

Unincorporated communities

Burksville
Cherry Box
Elgin
Emden
Enterprise
Epworth
Hagers Grove
Kellerville
Kendall
Kirby
Lakeland
Lakenan
Lentner
Maud
Oakdale
Sigsbee
Walkersville

Notable people
 Edward McKendree Bounds – clergyman and author
 Norm Stewart, legendary University of Missouri basketball coach (from Shelbyville)
 Randall Duke Cunningham, only U.S. Navy fighter ace of the Vietnam War, former Republican U.S. Representative from California (raised in Shelbina)
 Frank Hamilton Short, conservationist and advocate for states' rights and private development of natural resources in the early 20th century (born in Shelby County in 1862)
 Sam Walton, founder of Wal-Mart
 James Earl Ray, assassin of Martin Luther King Jr, lived in Shelbina for a brief time.

See also
National Register of Historic Places listings in Shelby County, Missouri

References

Further reading
 General History Of Shelby County Missouri (1911) online

External links
 Digitized 1930 Plat Book of Shelby County  from University of Missouri Division of Special Collections, Archives, and Rare Books

 
1835 establishments in Missouri
Populated places established in 1835